The 1954–55 NCAA Division I men's ice hockey season began in November 1954 and concluded with the 1955 NCAA Men's Ice Hockey Tournament's championship game on March 12, 1955 at the Broadmoor Ice Palace in Colorado Springs, Colorado. This was the 8th season in which an NCAA ice hockey championship was held and is the 61st year overall where an NCAA school fielded a team.

Regular season

Season tournaments

Standings

1955 NCAA Tournament

Note: * denotes overtime period(s)

Player stats

Scoring leaders
The following players led the league in points at the conclusion of the season.

GP = Games played; G = Goals; A = Assists; Pts = Points; PIM = Penalty minutes

Leading goaltenders
The following goaltenders led the league in goals against average at the end of the regular season while playing at least 33% of their team's total minutes.

GP = Games played; Min = Minutes played; W = Wins; L = Losses; OT = Overtime/shootout losses; GA = Goals against; SO = Shutouts; SV% = Save percentage; GAA = Goals against average

Awards

NCAA

WIHL

References

External links
College Hockey Historical Archives
1954–55 NCAA Standings

 
NCAA